Archie Mitchell is a character from EastEnders.

Archie Mitchell may also refer to:

Archie Mitchell (footballer) (1885–1949), English football centre-half and manager
Archie E. Mitchell (born 1918), minister with the Christian and Missionary Alliance